Tammy Hansen Grady (also known as Tammy Hanson or Tammy Grady) is an American-born actress, recording artist, photographer and former glamour model. She was born in Los Angeles, California on September 29, 1970. She has appeared in 16 music videos. At present, she is a DP, camera operator and enjoys making films of her own.

Early life 
Grady is the daughter of Beverly Harris, a singer of the band, The Harris sisters (Beverly, Marcene and Betty) on Capitol Records and their songs include kissin bug and others. Her mother later joined the group, The Platters. Her aunt, Marcene Harris was a pianist and songwriter for Nancy Wilson and Burt Bacharach. Another of her aunt, Betty, was the wife of the comedian Redd Foxx. Tammys stepfather, Victor Hanson, had two master's degrees from UCLA for Theater Arts and Cinematography and she learned about cameras and got the interest in acting from him at an early age. Victor Hansen was involved in the making of the culturally relevant, Skaterdater a 1965 American short film. It was produced by Marshal Backlar, and written and directed by Noel Black and was the winner of the Palme d'Or for Best Short Film at the 1966 Cannes Film Festival.

Career 
Grady was an actress and pro skater on the Television show RollerGames on KTLA channel 5.  She also sang the lead vocals for the same show, Hit and Run and Bad Attitude. She has sung on film soundtracks to live performances in many countries. Numerous guest appearances on shows including, "The Geraldo show, Joe Bob Briggs Movie Drive-in Show, Las Vegas Cast Party and special bits on the hit series, Bay Watch. She was chosen by Playboy and was selected to shoot with Stephen Wayda. She was also selected to perform for Playboy's Girls of Rock in Roll in Las Vegas, Reno and Monte Carlo. Grady was also trophy girl at NAACP awards, Hall of fame Fredricks of Hollywood model and Ujena swimwear model.   To pursue her passion for the craft of acting Grady was encouraged to go to London.  She was accepted to the prestigious London Academy of Music and Dramatic Art in England where she studied Shakespeare in 1991. Later, studied with legendary acting coach, Susan Batson Tammy did extensive study on the character work to play the 1940s star, Frances Farmer for Drop-In a theatre piece developed and produced by Susan Batson, Corey Parker and Carl Ford. Following up with the character, Zola Taylor in the one -act play, Why do Fools fall in love about Frankie Lymon at The Stella Adler Theater in Hollywood. Meanwhile, Hollywood, major casting director Billy Hopkins auditioned Tammy and called her back considering her for two pinnacle roles, one in a film called, The Perez Family (Marisa Tomei,Alfred Molina and Anjelica Huston) and the other an untitled, Oliver Stone picture to play opposite Al Pacino.  Grady ultimately lost out on the both roles and that marked a turning point to give up acting for a while. "Walking out the door of that audition at the Chateau Marmont I knew if I didn't get this part, it was time for me to quit acting for a while and I'd need to face the other reality that I kept at bay or just didn't see for myself for many many years." "That being to lead a normal life... perhaps marriage, children and focus on family." However, In 2010–2011, she returned to her roots behind the camera as a student at the New York Film Academy in Los Angeles and wrote, filmed and directed two short films:

 A Blissful Moment
 Birthright

Filmography

See also 
 Kent Harris

References

External links 
 
 

1970 births
Living people
20th-century American actresses
Female models from California
20th-century American singers
Actresses from Los Angeles
American film actresses
21st-century American singers
21st-century American actresses